Mark Williams ZNZ is the fifth studio album by New Zealand singer Mark Williams. It was his first album in over ten years. The album spawned the most-successful single of his career in Australia, "Show No Mercy". The album was released in August 1990 and peaked at number 45 on the ARIA albums chart.

The album was released in Germany by Polydor Records under the title Show No Mercy in 1993.

Track listing
CD (466609 2)

Charts

References

1990 albums
CBS Records albums
Albert Productions albums
Mark Williams (singer) albums